202nd Division or 202nd Infantry Division may refer to:

 202nd Infantry Division (German Empire)
 Italian 202nd Coastal Division
 202nd Division (Imperial Japanese Army)